Alabama Day is a holiday celebrated on December 14. It commemorates Alabama's admission to the Union as the 22nd state on December 14, 1819. The Alabama Legislature adopted a resolution calling for the observance of the day in 1923, at the urging of the Alabama Department of Education and Alabama Department of Archives and History.

References

Alabama culture
December observances
State holidays in the United States